Irina Mistyukevich (born 17 June 1977) is a Russian middle-distance runner. She competed in the women's 800 metres at the 2000 Summer Olympics.

References

1977 births
Living people
Athletes (track and field) at the 2000 Summer Olympics
Russian female middle-distance runners
Olympic athletes of Russia
Place of birth missing (living people)